Eric of Sachsen-Lauenburg (1472 – 20 October 1522) was Bishop of Hildesheim as Eric II  from 1502 to 1503 and Bishop of Münster as Eric I from 1508 to 1522.

Life
Eric was one of ten children of Duke John V of Saxe-Lauenburg and Dorothea of Brandenburg (1446–1519), daughter of the Elector Frederick II of Brandenburg.  He came into contact with the cathedral chapter at Cologne at an early age.  In 1484 it was proposed that he should study at university, so he went to Cologne and graduated in law (in particular, canon law) at the University of Cologne.

In 1487, he was ordained as a priest and on 27 October 1490, he received a prebendary in Cologne.  He held another prebendary in Hildesheim, where he was elected bishop on 21 May 1502.  His election was confirmed by Pope Alexander VI.  His consecration was scheduled for 12 July 1503, however, he resigned before that date in favour of his brother John IV of Saxe-Lauenburg, possibly because the Diocese of Hildesheim was too heavily indebted.  Eric returned to his post in Cologne.

In 1508, Conrad VI of Rietberg, Bishop of Osnabrück and Münster, died.  The cathedral chapter at Münster elected Eric as his successor, preferring him over Francis of Waldeck and John of Rietberg, a nephew of the late Conrad and canon at Cologne.  Eric was consecrated a bishop in the same year and celebrated his First Mass, assisted by his brother John and his half-brother Bernard.  Eric appointed Bernard of Saxony (died before 21 February 1549), an illegitimate son of his father (not to be confused with his legitimate brother Bernard of Saxe-Lauenburg, died 1524, Provost of Cologne and Magdeburg), as auxiliary bishop in Münster.

During the Hildesheim Diocesan Feud, Eric supported his brother, the Bishop of Hildesheim.  This, he belonged to the League of Lüneburg, opposing Henry the Younger of Brunswick-Wolfenbüttel, Eric I of Brunswick-Göttingen-Calenberg, Bishop Francis of Minden, and the Knights of Saldern.  Emperor Charles V imposed an imperial ban on all members of the League, including Eric.

During a dispute with Count Klaus the Hedges Rider of Tecklenburg, Eric occupied the County of Lingen.

Ancestry

References

Wilhelm Kohl (ed.): Germania Sacra. New series, vol. 37.3, De Gruyter, Berlin, 2003,  (= Diocese of Münster 7, the Dioceses 3), pp. 529–538.

House of Ascania
15th-century German Roman Catholic bishops
16th-century German Roman Catholic bishops
Eric 02
Eric 01
1472 births
1522 deaths
16th-century bishops in the Holy Roman Empire
Sons of monarchs